Zhazira Abdrakhmanovna Zhapparkul (born 22 December 1993 in Arys) is a Kazakh Olympian weightlifter who competes in the women's 69 kg weight category. She took silver medals at the 2014 and 2015 World Championships.
She represented Kazakhstan at the 2016 Summer Olympics, she placed second, winning the silver medal.

Personal life 
Zhazira is the seventh child in her family. Since 2001, she started to practice weightlifting. She is now living and training in Shymkent.

Career
Zhazira won the gold medal in the Women's 63 kg weight class at the 2010 Youth Olympic Games in Singapore.

Zhazira achieved 118 kg in snatch and 144 kg in clean and jerk, winning a silver medal with a total of 262 kg, competing in the -69 kg class at the 2014 World Weightlifting Championships in front of her home crowd. 

In 2015, Zhapparkul moved to the 69 kg category. She won silver medal at the 2015 World Championships in Houston.

Zhapparkul competed at the Rio 2016 Summer Olympics, where she captured a silver medal in the 69 kg event.

Major results

See also 
 Muslim women in sport

References

External links

 
 
 

1993 births
Living people
World Weightlifting Championships medalists
Kazakhstani female weightlifters
Weightlifters at the 2014 Asian Games
Weightlifters at the 2010 Summer Youth Olympics
Weightlifters at the 2016 Summer Olympics
Olympic silver medalists for Kazakhstan
Olympic weightlifters of Kazakhstan
Medalists at the 2016 Summer Olympics
Olympic medalists in weightlifting
Asian Games competitors for Kazakhstan
Youth Olympic gold medalists for Kazakhstan
People from Turkistan Region